Pillavalu Gajapathi Krishnaveni (3 November 1935 – 16 August 2004), popularly known as Jikki, was an Indian playback singer. She sang mainly in Telugu and Tamil films. She also sang in Kannada, Malayalam, Hindi, and Sinhala languages.

Discography

Bibliography

Lists of songs
Discographies of Indian artists